Sebastián Muñoz (c.1654, Casarrubios del Monte - 20 March 1690, Madrid) was a Spanish Baroque painter.

Life and work 
By January 1680, he was in Madrid, assisting Claudio Coello with decorations to celebrate the arrival of Marie Louise d'Orléans, the new wife of King Charles II. He used the money that he earned to go to Italy. Later that year, he joined with expatriate Spanish painters in petitioning the King to establish a Spanish painting academy in Rome. While there, he apparently studied with Carlo Maratta.

Back in Madrid, in 1686, he worked at the Royal Alcázar, where he painted the ceiling of the Queen's room with a scene from Orlando Furioso. Only a preparatory sketch has survived. Elsewhere in the palace, he created a scene from the mythological story of Psyche and Cupid, which earned him an appointment as court painter. It has since been lost. In 1689, he painted the Queen's funeral for the Convento del Carmen Calzado. It is said that the monks didn't recognize the Queen as portrayed, so Muñoz had to place her portrait in a medallion, supported by angels.

At the Buen Retiro Palace, he worked on decorations for the private rooms of the new Queen, Maria Anna of Neuburg, at the same time he began restoring the frescoes in the cupola at the Basilica of Nuestra Señora de Atocha. While occupied with the latter project, he slipped and fell to his death from the scaffolding. A monumental canvas depicting the "Martyrdom of Saint Andrew" was left unfinished at the parish church in his hometown.

References

Further reading

External links 

Biography @ the Museo del Prado
Digitalized works @ the Biblioteca Digital Hispánica of the Biblioteca Nacional de España

1650s births
1690 deaths
Spanish painters
Fresco painters
Deaths from falls
People from the Province of Toledo